The Palace of Venaria (Italian: Reggia di Venaria Reale) is a former royal residence and gardens located in Venaria Reale, near Turin in the Piedmont region in northern Italy. It is one of the Residences of the Royal House of Savoy, included in the UNESCO Heritage List in 1997.

The Palace was designed and built from 1675 by Amedeo di Castellamonte, commissioned by duke Charles Emmanuel II, who needed a base for his hunting expeditions in the heathy hill country north of Turin. The name itself derives from Latin, Venatio Regia meaning "Royal Hunt". It was enlarged to become a luxurious residence for the House of Savoy. The palace complex became a masterpiece of Baroque architecture and was filled with decoration and artwork. It fell into disuse at the end of the 18th century. After the Napoleonic wars, it was used for military purposes until 1978, when its renovation began, leading to the largest restoration project in European history. It opened to the public on October 13, 2007, and it has since become a major tourist attraction and exhibition space.

It is noted for its monumental architecture and Baroque interiors by Filippo Juvarra, including the Galleria Grande and its marble decorations, the chapel of Saint Uberto, and its extensive gardens. It received 1,048,857 visitors in 2017, making it the sixth most visited museum in Italy.

History
Charles Emmanuel II was inspired by the example of the Castle of Mirafiori, built by Duke Charles Emmanuel I for his wife Catherine Michaela of Spain. Keen to leave a memorial of himself and his wife, Marie Jeanne of Savoy-Nemours, he bought the two small villages of Altessano Superiore and Altessano Inferiore from the Milanese-origin Birago family, who had employed the land for agricultural use. The place was rechristened Venaria for its future function as a hunting base (Venatio, in Latin). The construction of this residence fell in the larger plan of surrounding the city of Turin with a garland of delicacies (Corona di Delizie), a system of palaces and leisure residences which included the Palazzina di caccia of Stupinigi, Castle of Rivoli, Villa della Regina, and others. 

The plan envisioned a grandiose ensemble of a palace, gardens, hunting woods, and a new town, bearing a noteworthy scenographic impact. The new town's plan was circular to reflect the round shape of the collar of the Supreme Order of the Most Holy Annunciation, a dynastic order created by the House of Savoy. In 1675 the borough and the palace were nearly completed, including the so-called Reggia di Diana (Royal Residence of Diana), the heart of the complex. Works however continued until the next century, as in 1693 French invasion troops are known to have destroyed some buildings and Duke (future King) Victor Amadeus II had the residence modified according to French canons, with the intent of rivalling the Palace of Versailles. Starting in 1699, the new project director was Michelangelo Garove, who followed Victor Amadeus' intent of building an ever more grandiose palace.

Further damage was inflicted during the Siege of Turin (1706), when the French troops under Louis d'Aubusson de La Feuillade were garrisoned there. After the Savoyard victory, Victor Amadeus placed Filippo Juvarra in charge of the project in 1716. Juvarra completed the chapel, the Great Gallery, the Citronerie, and the stables, and the renovation in French-style of the facades, elevating the palace to a Baroque masterpiece. During the reign of Charles Emmanuel III, under the direction of Benedetto Alfieri, the palace was enlarged with new stables, galleries, and supporting buildings. With the fall of the Ancien Régime, the palace fell in disuse.

The last buildings date from the mid-18th and early 19th centuries (stables, riding school, stair of the Reggia di Diana, gallery of Sant'Uberto); subsequently the Palace was abandoned in favour of the Palazzina di Caccia di Stupinigi (1729), which was by then more in tune with the tastes of the European courts.

During the Napoleonic domination, the structures were turned into barracks and the gardens were destroyed to create a training ground. The complex maintained this role after the fall of Napoleon and was used by the Italian Army until 1978, when it was sold to the Ministry of Culture.

In 1997 it was added to the UNESCO Heritage List as part of the Residences of the Royal House of Savoy, together with other landmarks such as the Royal Palace of Turin and the Palazzina di caccia of Stupinigi. Restoration works were begun in 1999, and encapsulated the palace, gardens, and the historic center of the town. It was the largest restoration project in European history, with 100.000 m2 of buildings area, 1.000 frescoes, 9.5000 m2 stuccoes, 800.000 m2 garden area being renovated.

The complex was open for tourism from 13 October 2007, and has since become a major tourist destination and space for exhibitions and events. It received 1,048,857 visitors in 2017, making it the sixth most visited museum in Italy. In 2019 it was chosen as Italy's most beautiful parks. The palace's restaurant was awarded a Michelin star.

In recent years, it has served as a filming location for several movies, including The King's Man and Miss Marx. The palace hosted the "Turquoise Carpet" and Opening Ceremony events for the Eurovision Song Contest 2022.

Architecture

The Palace

The palace is made up of two distinct wings: the original 17th century core of the residence, which is covered in white plaster, and the later 18th-century addition, with exposed brickwork. The entrance of the palace leads into the Cour d'honneur ("Honour Court"), which once housed a fountain with a deer. The main facade, covered with plaster and featuring cornucopias, shells and fruits, is connected on the right by section with the 18th-century wing. The two towers date to the Michelangelo Garove period (1669–1713) and are covered with multicolour pentagonal tiles in ceramics, which are united by a large gallery, known as Galleria Grande.

The Cour d'honneur leads into the Sala di Diana (The Hall of Diana), which functions as the heart of the palace. It is a rectangular room, decorated with stuccoes and paintings obviously centred on the theme of hunting. These include the frescoed vault representing Olympus (work of Jan Miel) which pictures Jupiter offering a gift to Diana, huge equestrian portraits of the dukes and the court (works by various painters in the ducal service), and hunting-themed canvases by Jan Miel, including the Hunt for the Deer, the Hare, the Bear, the Fox, the Boar, the Death of the Deer, the Going to the Woods, the Assembly, the Curea.

The centrepiece of the 18th-century wing is the Galleria Grande (Grand Gallery), which is stucco decorations, 44 arched windows, and black and white tiled floor.

The interiors originally housed a large collection of stuccos, statues, paintings (according to Amedeo di Castellamonte, up to 8,000) from some of the court artists of the times, such as Vittorio Amedeo Cignaroli,  and Bernardino Quadri.

Gardens
The original gardens of the residence have now totally disappeared, since French troops turned them into training grounds. Earlier drawings show an Italian garden with three terraces connected by elaborate stairways and architectural features such as a clock tower in the first court, the fountain of Hercules, a theatre and parterres.

Recent works have recreated a park in modern style, exhibiting modern works by Giuseppe Penone, including a fake 12 m-high cedar housing the thermic discharges of the palace.

Juvarra Stables and Citroneria 
The Juvarrian stables consist of a large atrium (room 57) overlooking the gardens, and a large vaulted room divided in two by a wall: the Scuderia Grande (Grand Stable, room 58) on the north side, and the Citroneria (orangery, room 59) on the side south. The Citroniera consists of a large vaulted gallery (148 meters long, 14 wide, and 16 high) whose ancient function was the winter storage of citrus fruits grown in the gardens. The side walls are decorated by niches that give the gallery dynamism, the south the walls feature large arches surmounted by oculi that overlook the gardens, while the north wall (which separates the room from the stables) has trompe l'oeil windows that mimics the arches of the south wall. The environment is currently used for temporary exhibitions. The large stable (148 m long, 12 wide and 15 high) contained about 200 horses at the time and sheltered the north side of the Citroniera in winter. Currently, the room exhibits carriages, uniforms, and the Venetian Bucintoro. The latter was commissioned in Venice by Vittorio Amedeo II between 1729 and 1731. Among the carriages on display there is the golden gala sedan, commissioned by Vittorio Emanuele II, the silver sedan of Queen Margherita and some carriages of Umberto I and Vittorio Emanuele III. In addition, Napoleon's carriage on temporarily exhibition.

Church of Sant'Uberto
After the death of Garove (1713), Juvarra was commissioned by Vittorio Amedeo II to build a church dedicated to Saint Hubertus, patron of hunters. The grandiose baroque church presents a Greek-cross plan with an octagonal core, and houses a large high altar inside, two side altars, and four side chapels located diagonally. Due to the church's position within the palace complex, it was impossible to build a dome. It was instead simulated with a trompe-l'œil painted on the vaulting by Giovanni Antonio Galliari. Juvarra decided to push facade back from in relation to the Grand Galley, in order to obtain a parvise in front of the church.

Inside, the entablature is supported by tall lesenes topped with Corinthian capitals. The sculptural program, built between 1724 and 1729, is the work of Giovanni Baratta and his nephew Giovanni Antonio Cybei. It features tribunes on the upper level, that were used by the monarch and the royal court when attending mass.  the large high altar, decorated with flying angels supporting a ciborium in the shape of a small temple, and the four statues of the doctors of the church: St. Augustine, St. Ambrose, St. Athanasius and St. John Chrysostom around the central nave. The pictorial program, centred on the figure of the Virgin Mary and associated saints, is presented on the paintings placed on the side altars and in the chapels, works by Francesco Trevisani, Sebastiano Ricci and Sebastiano Conca. The upper level of the church houses tribunes The baptismal font is located in the chapel to the left of the entrance. The connections of the church with the Royal Palace were completed under Carlo Emanuele III by Benedetto Alfieri, who designed the monumental staircase that gives access to the upper tribune and the tunnel connecting the chapel with the Citroniera. After the period of abandonment of the palace, the chapel underwent a minor renovation in 1961 on the occasion of the 1961 Italian Expo, and then a complete renovation with the rest of the palace in 1999. Its opening to the public was celebrated on 3 September 2006 with a concert.

Gallery

See also
 List of Baroque residences
Lux (album) – a 2012 album by Brian Eno which was initially a soundtrack for the Grand Gallery

Sources

References

External links
  
 A.V.T.A. – Royal Palace of Venaria (en)
 
Virtual tour of the Palace of Venaria provided by Google Arts & Culture

Residences of the Royal House of Savoy
Venaria
Gardens in Piedmont
Museums in Piedmont
Buildings and structures in the Metropolitan City of Turin
Historic house museums in Italy
National museums of Italy
Houses completed in the 17th century
Houses completed in the 18th century
World Heritage Sites in Italy
Italian Baroque gardens
Venaria
Rococo architecture in Italy
Filippo Juvarra buildings
Venaria Reale
18th-century architecture in Italy